Cantrall is a village in Sangamon County, Illinois, United States. The population was 139 at the 2000 census. It is part of the Springfield, Illinois Metropolitan Statistical Area.

Geography
Cantrall is located at  (39.936969, -89.676634).

Demographics

As of the census of 2000, there were 139 people, 53 households, and 40 families residing in the village. The racial makeup of the village was 99.28% White, and 0.72% Asian.

There were 53 households, out of which 43.4% had children under the age of 18 living with them, 66.0% were married couples living together, 3.8% had a female householder with no husband present, and 24.5% were non-families. 22.6% of all households were made up of individuals, and 11.3% had someone living alone who was 65 years of age or older. The average household size was 2.62 and the average family size was 3.08.

In the village, the age distribution of the population shows 25.2% under the age of 18, 5.8% from 18 to 24, 30.9% from 25 to 44, 20.1% from 45 to 64, and 18.0% who were 65 years of age or older. The median age was 40 years. For every 100 females, there were 113.8 males. For every 100 females age 18 and over, there were 100.0 males.

The median income for a household in the village was $45,000, and the median income for a family was $45,417. Males had a median income of $49,375 versus $21,719 for females. The per capita income for the village was $21,610. There were none of the families and 1.4% of the population living below the poverty line, including no under eighteens and none of those over 64.

Local attractions

Notable person

 Carl Vandagrift, infielder for the Indianapolis Hoosiers; born in Cantrall

References

Villages in Sangamon County, Illinois
Villages in Illinois
Springfield metropolitan area, Illinois